Barny is a brand of cakes, mainly distributed in the United Kingdom and Slovakia. Mondelēz claimed it was its biggest biscuit category launch since Belvita in 2010. The product is distributed in over 40 countries.

It is also marketed in Poland as "Lubisie", in Romania as "Barni", and in Hungary as "Dörmi".

Fillings
Barny cakes have a range of four different fillings:

Chocolate
Milk
Strawberry
Apple

References

Brand name snack foods